The Reichsgau Wartheland (initially Reichsgau Posen, also: Warthegau) was a Nazi German Reichsgau formed from parts of Polish territory annexed in 1939 during World War II. It comprised the region of Greater Poland and adjacent areas. Parts of Warthegau matched the similarly named pre-Versailles Prussian province of Posen. The name was initially derived from the capital city, Posen (Poznań), and later from the main river, Warthe (Warta).

During the Partitions of Poland from 1793, the bulk of the area had been annexed by the Kingdom of Prussia until 1807 as South Prussia. From 1815 to 1849, the territory was within the autonomous Grand Duchy of Posen, which was the Province of Posen until Poland was re-established in 1918–1919 following World War I. The area is currently the Greater Poland Voivodeship.

Invasion and occupation of Poland

After the invasion of Poland, the conquered territory of Greater Poland was split between four Reichsgaue and the General Government area (further east). The Militärbezirk Posen was created in September 1939, and on 8 October 1939 annexed by Germany. It was named the Reichsgau Posen, and SS Obergruppenfuhrer Arthur Greiser was appointed Gauleiter on 21 October. He would remain in office through the end of the war. Reichsgau Posen was renamed Reichsgau Wartheland on 29 January 1940.

The Wehrmacht established there the Wehrkreis XXI, based at Poznań, under the command of General der Artillerie Walter Petzel. Its primary operational unit was the 48th Panzer Korps, covering so-called Militärische Unterregion-Hauptsitze including Posen (Poznań), Lissa (Leszno), Hohensalza (Inowrocław), Leslau (Włocławek), Kalisch (Kalisz), and Litzmannstadt (Łódź). It maintained training areas at Sieradz and Biedrusko.

The territory was inhabited predominantly by ethnic Poles with a German minority of 16.7% in 1921, and Polish Jews, most of whom were imprisoned at the Łódź Ghetto eventually, and exterminated at Chełmno extermination camp (Vernichtungslager Kulmhof) within the next two years.

Characteristics

The Gauleiter and Reichsstatthalter of Reichsgau Wartheland, native-born Arthur Greiser, embarked on a program of complete removal of the formerly Polish citizenry upon his nomination by Heinrich Himmler. The plan also entailed the re-settling of ethnic Germans from the Baltic and other regions into farms and homes formerly owned by Poles and Jews. He also authorized the clandestine operation of exterminating 100,000 Polish Jews (about one-third of the total Jewish population of Wartheland), in the process of the region's complete "Germanization". In the first year of World War II, some 630,000 Poles and Jews were forcibly removed from Wartheland and transported to the occupied General Government (more than 70,000 from Poznań alone) in a series of operations called the Kleine Planung covering most Polish territories annexed by Germany at about the same time.
Both Poles and Jews had their property confiscated.

By the end of 1940, some 325,000 Poles and Jews from the Wartheland and the Polish Corridor were expelled to General Government, often forced to abandon most of their belongings. Fatalities were numerous. In 1941, the Nazis expelled a further 45,000 people, and from autumn of that year, they began killing Jews by shooting and in gas vans, at first spasmodically and experimentally. Reichsgau Wartheland had the population: 4,693,700 by 1941. Greiser wrote in November 1942: "I myself do not believe that the Führer needs to be asked again in this matter, especially since at our last discussion with regard to the Jews he told me that I could proceed with these according to my own judgement."

End of war
By 1945 nearly half a million Germanic Volksdeutsche had been resettled in the Warthegau alone among the areas annexed by Germany while the Soviet forces began to push the retreating German forces back through the Polish lands. Most German residents along with over a million colonists fled westward. Some did not, due to restrictions by Germany's own government and the quickly advancing Red Army. An estimated 50,000 refugees died from the severe winter conditions, others as war atrocities committed by the Soviet military. The remaining ethnically German population was expelled to new Germany after the war ended.

See also
History of Poland (1939–1945)
World War II atrocities in Poland
Special Prosecution Book-Poland
Intelligenzaktion
Volksdeutscher Selbstschutz

Notes

Further reading
 -  DOI 10.1017/S0008938914000648, online publication on 15 May 2014

Sources
Shoa.de - List of Gaue and Gauleiter 
Die NS Gaue at the Deutsches Historisches Museum website 
Die Gaue der NSDAP 

 
Former administrative regions of Greater Poland
Wartheland, Reichsgau
Wartheland
Polish areas annexed by Nazi Germany
Wartheland
Germany–Poland relations
1939 establishments in Germany
1945 disestablishments in Germany
Holocaust locations in Poland